Oxygen is the second album from Canadian industrial/metal band Varga.

Track listing
"Healer" – 3:51
"Words" – 3:49
"So Real" – 3:42
"The Passage" – 4:21
"Closed" – 4:12
"Skeletons" – 4:08
"Follow" – 3:24
"Needlestack" – 5:07
"Underneath" – 3:24
"The Den" – 4:12
"Red Ribbons" – 3:54
"The Really Impossible To Find Hidden Track" – 2:42

1996 albums
Zoo Entertainment (record label) albums
Varga (band) albums